Buckey may refer to:

Buckey Lasek also known as Bucky Lasek (born 1972), professional skateboarder
Buckey O'Neill (1860–1898), American soldier, sheriff, newspaper editor, miner, politician, gambler and lawyer, mainly in Arizona, USA
Buckey Staggers also known as Harley O. Staggers, Jr. (born 1951), Democratic U.S. politician
Jay C. Buckey (born 1956), American physician, engineer, and astronaut who flew aboard one space shuttle mission (STS-90) as a Payload Specialist
Jeff Buckey, professional American football player who played offensive lineman for four seasons
Peggy McMartin Buckey, known in connection with the McMartin preschool trial, a day care sexual abuse case of the 1980s

See also
Buckey O'Neill Cabin, built in 1890 by William "Buckey" O'Neill in what would become Grand Canyon National Park
Buckey O'Neill monument, equestrian sculpture by Solon Borglum at Courthouse Plaza, Prescott, Arizona, USA
Kitterman-Buckey Farm, historic home and farm complex located at Johnsville, Frederick County, Maryland, USA

Lists of people by nickname